IEEE 802.11be is the next amendment of the 802.11 IEEE standard, which will be designated . It will build upon 802.11ax, focusing on WLAN indoor and outdoor operation with stationary and pedestrian speeds in the 2.4, 5, and 6 GHz frequency bands. Speeds are expected to reach a theoretical maximum of 30 Gbit/s.

Development of the 802.11be amendment is ongoing, with a goal of an initial draft by March 2021, and a final version expected by early 2024. Recently in the last few months (November, December 2022) Wi-Fi 7 has been marketed and announced for 2023. However a soft launch in China for the IEEE 802.11be revision for Wi-Fi, has been released on the SoC Qualcomm Snapdragon 8 Gen 2. Marketing for Wi-Fi 7 has been updated on TP-Link and Intel's websites, with TP-Link stating various commercial products with Wi-Fi 7 connectivity coming soon as of 2022.

Candidate features
The main candidate features mentioned in the 802.11be Project Authorization Request (PAR) are:
 320 MHz bandwidth and more efficient utilization of non-contiguous spectrum,
 Multi-band/multi-channel aggregation and operation,
 16 spatial streams and Multiple Input Multiple Output (MIMO) protocols enhancements,
 Multi-Access Point (AP) Coordination (e.g. coordinated and joint transmission),
 Enhanced link adaptation and retransmission protocol (e.g. Hybrid Automatic Repeat Request (HARQ)),
 If needed, adaptation to regulatory rules specific to 6 GHz spectrum,
 Integrating Time-Sensitive Networking (TSN) IEEE 802.1Q extensions for low-latency real-time traffic:
 IEEE 802.1AS timing and synchronisation
 IEEE 802.11aa MAC Enhancements for Robust Audio Video Streaming (Stream Reservation Protocol over IEEE 802.11)
 IEEE 802.11ak Enhancements for Transit Links Within Bridged Networks (802.11 links in 802.1Q networks)
 Bounded latency: credit-based (IEEE 802.1Qav) and cyclic/time-aware traffic shaping (IEEE 802.1Qch/Qbv), asynchronous traffic scheduling (IEEE 802.1Qcr-2020)
 IEEE 802.11ax Scheduled Operation extensions for reduced jitter/latency

Additional features

Apart from the features mentioned in the PAR, there are newly introduced features:
 Newly introduced 4096-QAM (4K-QAM),
 Contiguous and non-contiguous 320/160+160 MHz and 240/160+80 MHz bandwidth,
 Frame formats with improved forward-compatibility,
 Enhanced resource allocation in OFDMA,
 Optimized channel sounding that requires less airtime,
 Implicit channel sounding,
 More flexible preamble puncturing scheme,
 Support of direct links, managed by an access point.

Rate Set

Comparison

Notes

References

be
 
Networking standards
Wireless communication systems